Poya is a Buddhist public holiday in Sri Lanka.

Poya may also refer to:

In New Caledonia
 Persian boy name
 Poya, New Caledonia, a town
 Poya River
 AS Poya, a football club

Other meanings
 Poya people of Patagonia
 Poya Castle in Switzerland
 Poya (moth), a moth genus
 Poya Pictures, American film and video production company